Horsfieldia disticha is a species of plant in the family Myristicaceae. It is endemic to Brunei.

References

disticha
Endemic flora of Brunei
Taxonomy articles created by Polbot